Nsein Senior High School is a senior high school located at Nsein-Axim in the Western Region of Ghana. The school was originally known as the Osagyefo Dr Kwame Nkrumah Secondary School, then as Axim Secondary School, before finally being renamed to the Nsein Secondary School.

History
The school is one of the schools founded by the first president of Ghana, Dr. Kwame Nkrumah, in 1960.

Notable alumni
 Dr George Sipa-Yankey, former Minister for Health, Ghana
 Emmanuel Armah-Kofi Buah, former Deputy Minister of Energy, Ghana and Member of Parliament for Ellembelle

Catherine Ablema Afeku
Minister of State, Ghana and Member of Parliament for Evalue Gwira

See also

 Education in Ghana
 List of senior high schools in Ghana

References

1960 establishments in Ghana
Educational institutions established in 1960
High schools in Ghana
Education in the Western Region (Ghana)